Hastings District is a Territorial authority district within the Hawke's Bay Region, on the east coast of the North Island of New Zealand. It covers the southern half of the Hawke's Bay coast, excluding Napier City, which is a separate territorial authority. Hastings District Council is headquartered in the city of Hastings, the district's largest town.

The district has an area of 5,227 square kilometres. This comprises  people in the Hastings urban area,  people in the Havelock North urban area,  people in the Clive urban area, and  people in rural areas and settlements. 

Mayor Sandra Hazlehurst was elected as mayor in a by-election in 2017, and re-elected in the 2019 local elections.

Council history

Local government in the area began with the Havelock North Roads Board in 1871. It was replaced by a Town Board in 1912, and became Havelock North Borough Council in 1952. Hastings was a Town District in 1884. The Hastings Borough Council formed in 1886, and became Hastings City Council in 1956. Hawke's Bay County was established in 1876.

Hastings District was established from the merger of Havelock North Borough Council, Hastings City Council and the Hawke’s Bay County Council as part of the 1989 local government reforms.

Demographics

Hastings District had a population of 81,537 at the 2018 New Zealand census, an increase of 8,292 people (11.3%) since the 2013 census, and an increase of 10,695 people (15.1%) since the 2006 census. There were 28,131 households, comprising 40,029 males and 41,511 females, giving a sex ratio of 0.96 males per female. The median age was 39.1 years (compared with 37.4 years nationally), with 17,697 people (21.7%) aged under 15 years, 14,955 (18.3%) aged 15 to 29, 35,199 (43.2%) aged 30 to 64, and 13,689 (16.8%) aged 65 or older.

Ethnicities were 71.8% European/Pākehā, 27.3% Māori, 8.0% Pacific peoples, 5.6% Asian, and 1.6% other ethnicities. People may identify with more than one ethnicity.

The percentage of people born overseas was 17.2, compared with 27.1% nationally.

Although some people chose not to answer the census's question about religious affiliation, 46.4% had no religion, 39.5% were Christian, 3.0% had Māori religious beliefs, 0.8% were Hindu, 0.5% were Muslim, 0.6% were Buddhist and 2.7% had other religions.

Of those at least 15 years old, 10,692 (16.7%) people had a bachelor's or higher degree, and 13,131 (20.6%) people had no formal qualifications. The median income was $28,400, compared with $31,800 nationally. 8,223 people (12.9%) earned over $70,000 compared to 17.2% nationally. The employment status of those at least 15 was that 32,094 (50.3%) people were employed full-time, 9,483 (14.9%) were part-time, and 2,166 (3.4%) were unemployed.

Below is a list of urban areas that contain more than 1,000 population.

Other towns and settlements include (from north to south):

 Whirinaki
 Whakatu
 Te Awanga
 Maraekakaho
 Waimārama

Economy
The district, as one of the largest apple, pear and stone fruit producing areas in New Zealand, has an important relationship with the Napier Port. It has also become an important grape growing and wine production area with the fruit passing from the growers around Metropolitan Hastings and then to Napier for exporting. Napier is an important service centre for the agriculture and pastoral output of the predominantly rural Hastings District. Shopping is heavily weighted by large format retail in Hastings City, whereas in contrast, Havelock North, Taradale and central Napier retail areas have a more vibrant boutique flavour.

Tourism

Hastings District is historic and welcoming of tourists, although inbound tourism is typically focused on Napier. Hastings features a tourism industry based on 'lifestyle' activities rather than attractions. The majority of tourists are domestic, usually from other regions within New Zealand. Scheduled airline services to Hawke's Bay operate through Hawke's Bay Airport, and the nearby Hastings Aerodrome is available for private planes. Tourism in Hawke's Bay is growing at an extremely rapid rate. In the recent decade, Hawke's Bay Airport's annual passenger numbers have grown from a 2005 count of 297,000 to a count of 476,000 in the year ending 30 June 2015. In the next five years passenger numbers are expected to exceed 550,000, bringing many new people into Hawke's Bay, with Hastings benefiting from the greater tourism.

Hastings' largest draw card is the wine and food trail established around the productive hinterland. There are over 75 wineries in the surrounding area, including New Zealand's oldest winery restaurant (Vidal Estate). Boutique food industries are becoming popular with cheese, fine meats, and locally produced delicacies seen on display at the Hawkes Bay Farmer's Market (New Zealand's oldest and largest weekly farmer's market). Outdoor leisure activities dominate, with beaches, river, mountain biking, tramping, and golf, being popular. In summer, many large-scale events attract domestic tourists including the Spring Racing Carnival, The Blossom Parade, Harvest Hawkes Bay Weekend, and various concerts and events. The Blossom Festival was once a large national event in the mid-20th century, with charter trains from Wellington and Auckland coming for the event. This however has slowly declined in popularity.

Hastings' specialist attractions include: New Zealand's largest water park, called 'Splash Planet', which replaced 'Fantasyland' near the turn of the millennium, Cape Kidnappers (the world's largest mainland gannet colony), Te Mata Peak, and access to an abundance of nature reserves and mountain treks.

Education

Hastings, Flaxmere and Havelock North have secondary schools, and Hastings and Havelock North also have intermediate schools. Some secondary schools in Hastings and Havelock North are single-sex, but there are also co-educational secondary schools in those areas. Te Kura Kaupapa Māori o Te Wananga Whare Tapere o Takitimu is a Māori language immersion school in the Parkvale suburb of Hastings.

Sister cities
Hastings has had a sister city relationship with Guilin in China since 1981.

References

External links

Districts of New Zealand
 Hastings District